Leptagoniates is a genus of fish in the family Characidae. It contains the single species Leptagoniates steindachneri, which is found in the Amazon River basin in South America.

Another species, L. pi, has traditionally been placed in this genus, but it was moved to Protocheirodon in 2016.

References

Characidae
Fish of South America
Monotypic ray-finned fish genera
Characiformes genera
Fish described in 1887